James Glover may refer to:

James N. Glover (1837–1921), founding father of Spokane, Washington, USA
James Waterman Glover (1868–1941), American mathematician, statistician, and actuary
James Glover (British Army officer) (1929–2000), British general
James Glover (rugby league), rugby league player
James Alcorn Glover, lawyer and state legislator in Mississippi
Jimmy Glover, Irish composer, conductor, music critic, and journalist
Jamie Glover, English actor